Down in the Valley is an Ireland-only compilation of songs by The Handsome Family. It was released 1999 by Independent Records. The subtitle of the compilation runs: "A treasury of their most willowy and haunted songs." The compilation contains tracks from Odessa (1994) (tracks 10 & 13), Milk and Scissors (1996) (tracks 1, 3, 5, 7, 9, 14), and Through the Trees (1998) (tracks 2, 4, 6, 11, 12).

Track listing
"Tin Foil" – 2:41
"My Sister's Tiny Hands" – 3:28
"Lake Geneva" – 3:14
"Weightless Again" – 3:39
"#1 Country Song" – 3:37
"The Giant Of Illinois" – 3:06
"Drunk By Noon" – 2:51
"Don't be Scared" – 2:50 (a different version appears on In the Air)
"The House Carpenter" – 3:38
"Arlene" - 3:39
"The Woman Downstairs" - 4:47
"Cathedrals" - 3:23
"Moving Furniture" - 3:06
"The Dutch Boy" - 3:53

References

External links
The Handsome Family official website

The Handsome Family albums
1999 compilation albums